Cape Spencer can refer to 

 Cape Spencer (Alaska)
 Cape Spencer (South Australia)
 Cape Spencer (Antarctica)

See also
Cape Spencer-Smith, cape in Antarctica
Cape Spencer Light (disambiguation)